Lambert and Nuttycombe were an acoustic folk duo from Los Angeles active 1968-1972. The duo was formed by Craig Nuttycombe and California surf musician Denis Lambert who had met in a West Coast band called The Eastside Kids. The duo's recordings were reissued on CD in Japan in 2001.

Discography
At Home A&M Records 1970
As You Will 1973
Eternal Rivers : Demos 1969-1971
Old Friends - compilation for Japan market
Days Gone By - compilation for Japan market

References

American folk musical groups
1968 establishments in the United States